The geography of Shanghai is characterised by its location on the Yangtze River Delta on China's east coast and its proximity to the Pacific Ocean via the East China Sea. The city is centred on the Huangpu River, a tributary of the Yangtze River, and extends outwards in all directions, with the suburbs and satellite towns reaching east to the East China Sea, north and west to Jiangsu province, and south to Zhejiang province over Hangzhou Bay.

The vast majority of Shanghai's land area is flat, apart from a few hills in the southwest corner, due to its location on the alluvial plain of the Yangtze's river delta. The city has many rivers and lakes and is known for its rich water resources, and thanks to its coastal, riverside location and warm climate ensuring ice-free waters, provides easy access to China's interior, resulting in Shanghai being the world's largest port.

Statistics

Location
Shanghai is located in the middle of China's east coast, near the mouth of the Yangtze River, being one of the core cities in the  Yangtze River Delta region and one of the coastal cities in China. It is bordered by the Yangtze River to the north, the East China Sea to the east, Hangzhou Bay to the south, and Jiangsu and Zhejiang Provinces to the west. Cities within mainland China that lie on approximately the same longitude include Fuxin, Jinzhou, Dalian, Yantai, Ningbo, and Taizhou (Zhejiang). The municipality lies about due north of Taipei and Manila.

Latitude: 30° 42' to 31° 52' N
Longitude: 120° 52' to 121° 58' E

Area
Municipality:
Total: 
Land: 
Water:

Waterways
Shanghai contains  of rivers and streams and is part of the Lake Tai drainage area.

Islands

The Municipality of Shanghai administers a number of islands around its peninsula, including most of Chongming Island, the second-largest island of mainland China.

Most of Shanghai's islands are small alluvial islands created by the natural deposition of vast amounts of silt by the Yangtze River. The major islands of Chongming, Changxing, and Hengsha in Chongming County were formed in this way, as were the shoals of Jiuduansha off of Pudong. The natural expansion of these islands has been greatly accelerated by reclamation projects, with Chongming more than doubling in size between 1950 and 2010. Unlike the islands of Chongming County, Jiuduansha was expanded and protected as an uninhabited nature reserve to make up for the wetlands destroyed by the creation of Pudong International Airport. It is an important spawning ground for Shanghai's hairy crab community, as well as other maritime and avian species. A few islands in Hangzhou Bay off Jinshan District are rocky islands (also ). Dajinshan, Xiaojinshan, and Fushan are municipal nature reserves.

Shanghai does not administer the islands of Greater and Lesser Yangshan, the site of the Port of Shanghai's Yangshan Deep-Water Port. Instead, the belong to Zhejiang Province, despite being linked via the Donghai Bridge to Pudong. Similarly, Chongming's absorption of Jiangsu's Yonglongsha shoal produced a long but narrow exclave of that province on its northern shore.

Climate

Shanghai has a humid subtropical climate (Köppen climate classification Cfa) and experiences four distinct seasons. In winter, cold northerly winds from Siberia can cause nighttime temperatures to drop below freezing, and although not usually associated with snow, the city can receive one or two days of snowfall per year. In contrast, and in spite of being the peak tourist season, summer in Shanghai is very warm and humid, with occasional downpours or freak thunderstorms. The city is also susceptible to typhoons, none of which in recent years has caused considerable damage. The most pleasant seasons are Spring, although changeable, and Autumn, which is generally sunny and dry.

Climate statistics of 2013:
Average annual temperature: 	
Highest recorded air temperature: 
Lowest recorded air temperature: 
Annual hours of sunshine: 1,885.9 	
Evaporation: 
Precipitation: 
Annual rainy days: 111
Frost-free period: 259 days

Cityscape

Shanghai city proper is bisected by the Huangpu River: Puxi, on the west side, is the historic center of the city, and includes the districts of Yangpu, Hongkou,  Putuo, Changning, Xuhui, Jing'an,  and Huangpu. Pudong is located on the east side and is the location of Shanghai's rapid development, including its new famous skyline and the Lujiazui financial district.

The outer districts, or suburbs, surround the city proper, and are Baoshan, Minhang, Jiading, Jinshan, Songjiang, Qingpu,  Fengxian, and the rural eastern and southern part of Pudong.

Chongming is Shanghai's only current county and lies north of the Shanghai Peninsula on three inhabited islands in the Yangtze estuary: Chongming, Changxing, and Hengsha. Historical counties have included Nanhui and Chuansha.

Environment

Public awareness of the environment is growing, and the city is investing in a number of environmental protection projects. A 10-year, US$1 billion cleanup of Suzhou Creek, which runs through the city center, is expected to be finished in 2008, and the government also provides incentives for transportation companies to invest in LPG buses and taxis. Air pollution in Shanghai is low compared to other Chinese cities such as Beijing, but the rapid development over the past decades means it is still high on worldwide standards, comparable to Los Angeles.

Maps and satellite images

See also

Geography of China
Yangtze River Delta

References

External links
Shanghai official government site 

 
Geography of East China